Chiesa di Santa Maria in Portico is a late-baroque church in the city center of Naples placed at the end of its homonymous street, just off the seaside promenade of the Riviera di Chiaia.

While the original architect was Nicola Longo in 1632; the facade was completed by Arcangelo Guglielmelli in a pell-mell concoction of Mannerist and Baroque styles, utilizing columns and pilasters of varying sizes, volutes, and even obelisks with typical Neapolitan appeal to color differences.

Among the wealth of interior artwork are frescoes by Giovanni Battista Benaschi and interior architectural sculpture by Domenico Antonio Vaccaro. In addition, there is an Annunciation by Fabrizio Santafede and an Assumption by Paolo de Matteis.

References

External links

Cose Di Napoli (Things of Naples--Association For Tourism and Cultural Promotion) 

Roman Catholic churches in Naples
Baroque architecture in Naples
17th-century Roman Catholic church buildings in Italy